Borimir is a Slavic masculine given name derived from borti – "battle" and mir – "peace". The feminine form is Borimira.

The following notable people have this name:
 Borimir Karamfilov (born 1995), Bulgarian footballer
 Borimir Perković (born 1967), Croatian former footballer

References

See also
 Slavic names

Slavic masculine given names
Bulgarian masculine given names
Croatian masculine given names
Serbian masculine given names